San Isidro, officially the Municipality of San Isidro, is a 4th class municipality in the province of Leyte, Philippines. According to the 2020 census, it has a population of 30,722 people.

History
The Battle of Leyte Gulf during the Second World War is considered by most historians as the biggest naval battle in history. The scope of the encounter in terms of warships, warplanes, and manpower involved is nothing short of astounding. The casualties borne by both warring parties are incomparable to other similar engagements, to say the least. It was, by all standards, a decisive victory for the American naval forces and could easily have turned the tide in favor of the Japanese Imperial Navy had the result been otherwise.

The battle was waged in an attempt by the Japanese to thwart General Douglas MacArthur's bold return via the Leyte Landings on October 20, 1944, the second biggest amphibious invasion in modern history after the Normandy Invasion less than five months earlier. The Japanese naval forces organized three attack forces with the American landing armada in the Leyte Gulf as target. The largest attack group, organized hastily by the Japanese, was the Central Force headed by Admiral Kurita.  This powerful force encountered a token fleet of American escort ships in the Philippine Sea off the island of Samar. Despite overwhelming superiority, the Japanese Central Force surprisingly retreated through the San Bernardino Strait. Part of the remnants of the Central Force was pursued and destroyed by American warplanes.

There are six sunken Japanese warships in San Isidro Bay, northwest of Leyte Island.  The warships were destroyed on or about the same period when the Battle for Leyte Gulf was waged. This paper will attempt to establish the circumstances that led to the sinking and destruction of these ships. It will try to find out if the ill-fated vessels were among the remnants of the Japanese Central Force which retreated after almost bringing the Leyte Landings of the Allied Forces to their doom.

The Battle for Leyte Gulf was the most savage naval engagement of World War II.

Geography

Barangays
San Isidro is politically subdivided into 19 barangays.

Climate

Demographics

Economy

References

External links
 [ Philippine Standard Geographic Code]
Philippine Census Information
Local Governance Performance Management System

Municipalities of Leyte (province)